"Drive" is a song by British electronic music group Clean Bandit and German DJ Topic featuring English recording artist Wes Nelson. It was released on 30 July 2021, via Atlantic Records.

Critical reception
Simone Ciaravolo of Edm-Lab opined that the track "[is] full of positive vibes", and "brings [us] on a metaphorical nocturnal journey: the scenery of a newborn love story."

Music video
The music video was released on 6 August 2021, and directed by Dan Massie. It features Nelson as "a happy lorry driver, performing from the cab of his big truck through country and city, and into outer space." Katrina Rees of Celebmix praised the visual "perfectly captures the upbeat nature of the track, which is laced with pulsating beats and glossy strings."

Credits and personnel
Credits adapted from AllMusic.

 Grace Chatto – cello, producer, vocal producer
 Clean Bandit – primary artist
 Molly Fletcher – violin
 Stuart Hawkes – mastering
 Chloe Kraemer – engineer
 Wes Nelson – featured artist, vocals
 Alex Oriet – bass, composer, drums, keyboards, programmer, synthesizer
 Jack Patterson – composer, drums, keyboards, producer, programmer, synthesizer, vocal producer
 Luke Patterson – drums, keyboards, programmer, synthesizer
 David Phelan – bass, composer, drums, keyboards, programmer, synthesizer
 Beatrice Philips – violin
 Mark Ralph – drums, keyboards, mixing, producer, programmer, synthesizer
 Salt Wives – producer
 Alexander Tidebrink – composer
 Topic – drums, keyboards, primary artist, producer, programmer, synthesizer, composer
 Henry Tucker – composer

Charts

Weekly charts

Year-end charts

Certifications

References

2021 songs
2021 singles
Clean Bandit songs
Topic (DJ) songs
Song recordings produced by Mark Ralph (record producer)
Songs written by Topic (DJ)
Songs written by A7S
Songs written by Jack Patterson (Clean Bandit)
Atlantic Records singles